Sara Margrethe Oskal (born 1970) is a Norwegian Sami writer, actress, artisan, director and film producer from Kautokeino in the north of Norway. In 2012, she was nominated for the Nordic Council Literature Prize for her Sami poetry collection Savkkuhan sávrri sániid (Tireless Words).

Biography
Born in 1970 in Kautokeino, Finnmark County, Sara Margrethe Oskal studied drama at the Helsinki Theatre Academy before gaining a doctorate in performance art at the Oslo National Academy of the Arts in 2009. Her doctoral thesis dealt with the humour in traditional Sami stories and the art of Sami chanting.

Brought up by a family of reindeer herders, Oskal embarked on her literary career in 2006 with her Sami poetry collection Váimmu vuohttume, centred on the reindeer herding community and their local culture. In 2012, she published her second poetry collection Savkkuhan sávrri sániid, translated into Norwegian as Utrettelige ord (Tireless Words) in 2016. Evoking the often difficult encounters between Sami people and the sense of shame they often experience, the collection earned her the Nordic Council Literature prize for works in the Sami language. Her short poems are rich in alliteration, metaphor and striking pictorial language. They have been published in French and Breton in Vaimmu vuhttome / Kavell ma c'halon / Berceau de Mon cæur (2014).

Oskal has written a number of short stories, published in the collection Dál ja dalle (2010) which brings together submissions to a contest launched by the Sami publishing house Davvi Girji in 2009. The winning story, also titled Dál ja dalle, has been published in the English Anthology Whispering Treasures (2012).

In addition to her literary work, Oskal has contributed to theatre and film. In 2015, she produced the short film Aurora Keeps an Eye on You which was featured at the Tromsø International Film Festival in 2015 and at the Māoriland Film Festival in 2016.

External links

References

1970 births
Living people
Norwegian Sámi people
Norwegian actresses
People from Kautokeino
Norwegian Sámi-language writers
Norwegian women writers
Norwegian film directors
Norwegian film producers
Norwegian women film directors
Sámi actors